Osage (Osage:  Wažáže ie) is a Siouan language that is spoken by the Osage people of the US state of Oklahoma. Their original territory was in present-day Missouri and Kansas but they were gradually pushed west by European-American pressure and treaties.

Osage has an inventory of sounds very similar to that of Dakota, also a Siouan language, plus vowel length, preaspirated obstruents and an interdental fricative (like "th" in English "then").

Osage is written primarily with two systems: one using the Latin script with diacritics, and another derived Osage script created in 2006. Osage is among the few indigenous languages in the United States that has developed its own writing system.

Language revitalization 
As of 2009, about 15–20 elders were second-language speakers of Osage. The Osage Language Program, created in 2003, provides audio and video learning materials on its website. The 2nd Annual Dhegiha Gathering in 2012 brought Osage, Kaw, Quapaw, Ponca and Omaha speakers together to share best practices in language revitalization. In early 2015, Osage Nation Chief Thompson Raul Standing Bear announced he would make Osage language immersion a priority.

Phonology
Osage phonology is quite similar to that of Kansa. But, it preserves many historical alternations that have been leveled out in Kansa; for example, Kansa *u has merged with *i, whereas it is still largely distinct in Osage.

Vowels

Basic vowels
Osage has five plain vowels:

These are written . 
 is a high front vowel: like English i in ski.
 is a high non-back rounded vowel, like California or New Zealand English u in dude.
 is a half-open front vowel: like English e in bet.
 is a mid-back rounded vowel: like English o in bolt.
 is an open back vowel: like English a in bra.

It is especially far front  following a velar obstruent and when it is near a front vowel with no intervening obstruent. It most commonly conflates with  following ð and n.

Usually in fast speech, the /a/ is pronounced . This assimilation occurs after a stressed syllable, or at the end of a word. For example:  'cow',  'this one'.

Nasalized vowels
There are three vowels that carry this feature: . It is quite common for nasalized  to become a nasal  and vice versa. Non-nasalized vowels can be heard as nasalized as well. In general, vowels tend to become nasalized adjacent to another nasal vowel or consonant when there is no intervening obstruent. On the other hand, final nasal vowels tend to become oral. However, nasal vowels are always short, regardless of their position. 
Examples:  'girl' and  'mountain'

Vowel clusters and long vowels
According to Hans Wolff  (65), common Osage vowel clusters are:
iu  for example: niuʒõ 'Neosho River'
íe  for example: wíe 'I'
íĩ  for example: kasíĩte 'tomorrow'
iuĩ  for example: ékiuĩka 'don't'
éa  for example: cʼéaðe 'I killed him'
aĩ  for example: hówaĩke 'where?'
óa  for example: tóa 'this one'

Vowel length is important in Osage, but it is hard to perceive and has a good deal of variation. For example, long vowels are often reduced to short ones when they are not accented. Quintero took long vowels to be the underlying form in such situations. There is not enough information to specify exactly how the accent system works in Osage, and there is still uncertainty about Osage vowel length.

Oral vowels are long before non-stop consonants and in final stressed position. When they are unstressed in final position, they are always short.

Lengthening of short vowels often occurs in questions.
Example:  'you want' becomes ?

Long vowels also arise when ð is omitted between identical vowels.

Example: ðakʼéwaða 'be kind to them' may become ðakʼéwaa.

When e(e) changes to a(a), an immediately preceding c is often replaced by t (thought not always)

Example: océ 'look for, hunt for' becomes otá 'look for it!'

Diphthongs

The Osage script has letters to represent each of the diphthongs.

Consonants

There are thirty-one consonant phonemes in Osage, twenty-two of which are voiceless and nine are voiced. However, Osage has a rich system of stop sounds, known as the stop series, or the stop sequence. (See below)

Stop series

The stop series can be grouped according to five categories:

Voiceless preaspirated or fortis: which may be pronounced as geminates or preaspirated. As in other Siouan languages they sometimes derive from h-C sequences, but not always.
Voiceless plain or lenis: which are tenuis, and often lightly voiced.
Postaspirated: which never appear as a surface form.
Ejective . They cannot appear as the second member of a consonant cluster.
Voiced: with b being the only member in this category. The only environment this sound may appear in is in the cluster . The cluster itself generally appears in the first verb form, otherwise it is somewhat infrequent.(see historical phonology section).
The ejective, fortis, and lenis series of the alphabet are not distinguished in Osage orthography.

Listed below is some features and phonological alternations of Osage:

 occur before back vowels,  (usually) before the other vowels.

Examples:
íðotse 'be open'
ihtṍtse 'son-in-law'
ðekṍõce 'now'
 'rabbit'
 'you went'

The glottal stop  appears in clusters only after p, c, k, and it is not considered a true consonant of Osage. It is best thought of as a phonetic device used occasionally at utterance level, and it is typically to separate vowels that would otherwise contract.

Examples:
 'cough'
 'gourd'
 'spirit'
 'crow'

The phoneme  is always voiceless.
 usually has a single allophone , but in the Hominy dialect it has two allophones:  initially before  and  elsewhere.

 
Examples:
ðɑ̃lĩ  'good'
ðɑ̃brĩ  'three'
ðĩe  'you'
cʼéðe  'he killed it'

The  cluster also depends on dialect.
In some instances, due to morphologically complex formations,  is an allophone of 

Examples:
  'I'm finished'
  'I have'
  'I am unable'

The dentalveolar obstruents are often fricated: the ejective always (though it has other sources as well), and the other series before the front vowels . Exceptions occur due to compounding and other derivational processes. For example, from hką́ą́ce 'fruit' and oolá 'put in' is hkąącóla 'pie'. (The fricated allophone is written c.)

Č, hč are rare, and only found in diminutives: č only in two words, čóopa 'a little', čáahpa 'squat', and hč for hc in endearment forms of kin terms like wihčóšpa 'my grandchild'. In Hominy, šc is pronounced šč.

Consonant clusters

Osage has a simple expanded CV syllabic template: (C(C)) V (V). All consonants occur initially and medially; they never occur in final position. Consonant clusters of the type CC only occur in initial and medial positions.

Examples:
          pʃĩta 'I'll come (to your house)'
          kʃí 'he reached home'
          ʰtséka 'crazy'
          stúʒa 'you wash it'
          stsétse 'long'
          skɑ̃ 'white'
          ʃtátɑ̃ 'you drank it'
          ʃkṍʃta 'you wanted it'
          bráze 'torn'

Medial clusters may be divided into two groups:

Cluster whose first C is p, t, c, or k

Examples:
          tapʼõkʼe 'he hit it'
          wécʼa 'snake'
          nɑ̃ḱṍ 'he heard it'
          aṍpha 'I understand it'
          áthɑ̃ 'he kicked it'
          áððikhɑ̃ 'he lay down'
          épʃe 'I spoke'
          ðacpé 'to eat'
          nĩ́kʃe 'you are here'
          nã́kwĩ 'both, we two'

Cluster whose first C is s, ʃ, x, or h

Examples:
          ĩ́spe 'ax'
          laská 'flower'
          ókisce 'half'
          ðaʃtú 'to bite'
          paʃpú 'to chip'
          iʃtá 'eyes'
          walúʃks 'bug'
          mɑ̃ʃcĩ́ke 'rabbit'
          mɑ̃xpú 'clouds'
          ðaxtáke 'to bite'
          mõĩ́xka 'soil/dirt'
          wĩ́xci 'one'

Historical phonology

The historically aspirated series *pʰ *tʰ *kʰ is seldom realized with aspiration today.

Đ, n, r all derive from historic *r, and l from *kr and *xr. The latter is a recent phenomenon; in the 1930s words with modern l were transcribed xth and gth. Nonetheless, intervocalic ð is optionally pronounced  in many words. It is also sometimes strongly palatalized intervocalically, to the point of becoming .

The former derives from historic *xl, the latter from *kð and *gð; these sequences have largely merged with simple *l. This is productive; ð in verbs may become l when prefixed with k.

The r is apparently an approximant like English . Br is most common in first-person forms of verbs beginning with ð, where the 1sg agent prefix w(a)- assimilates to  before the ð, and indeed this was written bth in the 1930s. However, in rarer cases the origin of br is opaque.

References

Sources
 Quintero, Carolyn. The Osage Language. Lincoln, University of Nebraska Press, 2004. .
 Quintero, Carolyn. Osage Dictionary. Norman, University of Oklahoma Press, 2009. .
 Wolff, Hans. "Osage I: Phonemes and Historical Phonology". International Journal of American Linguistics 18.2 (1952): 63–68.

External links

Audio clips of Osage phrases
  (may require log-in access)

Osage Nation
Indigenous languages of Oklahoma
Native American language revitalization
Endangered indigenous languages of the Americas
Extinct languages of North America
Western Siouan languages
Languages extinct in the 2000s
Vulnerable languages